was a Japanese politician. He represented the Yamanashi Prefecture electoral district and later Yamanashi District No. 3 in the House of Representatives in the national Diet from 1993 until 2002 and was governor of Yamanashi Prefecture from 2007 until 2015. He was a graduate of the University of Tokyo Law Department.

References 
 

Members of the House of Representatives (Japan)
University of Tokyo alumni
People from Yamanashi Prefecture
1942 births
2020 deaths
Governors of Yamanashi Prefecture